This is a list of supermarket chains in Nigeria.

 Addide Supermarket
 FoodCo Supermarkets
 Game Stores
 Jara Superstore
 Shoprite
 Spar Supermarkets

See also
 List of supermarket chains in Africa

References

Nigeria

Economy of Nigeria-related lists
Supermarket chains
Nigeria